Thank U, Next is the fifth studio album by American singer Ariana Grande, released on February 8, 2019, by Republic Records. It was released six months after her fourth studio album Sweetener (2018), conceived in the midst of Grande's personal struggles, including the death of ex-boyfriend Mac Miller and the end of her engagement to Pete Davidson. Grande began working on the album in October 2018, enlisting writers and producers such as Tommy Brown, Max Martin, Ilya Salmanzadeh and Pop Wansel. With Thank U, Next, Grande distanced herself from the traditional promotion cycle that she employed for her previous album releases. Musically, the album is predominantly pop. It was described as Grande's most personal record up to that point, with its lyrical content reflecting on personal flaws, grief and denial, as well as independence and self-empowerment.

The album was preceded by two singles, the title track and "7 Rings", both of which debuted atop the Billboard Hot 100 chart, becoming Grande's first two number-one songs in the United States. "Break Up with Your Girlfriend, I'm Bored" became the third single on the day of the album's release, peaking at number two on the Hot 100. All of the album's 12 tracks entered the Hot 100, with the singles occupying the top three spots, making Grande the first soloist to achieve this feat. The album topped the charts in various countries, and broke many streaming records upon release, including the records for the largest weekly streams for a pop album and a female album in the United States. It was certified double platinum by the Recording Industry Association of America, and landed at number two on the US Billboard 200 Year-End chart of 2019. Globally, it was the eighth best-selling album of 2019, and fourth best-selling album by a female artist.

Upon its release, Thank U, Next received critical acclaim, with praise on its cohesiveness, the production and Grande's vulnerability throughout the record. Named by several publications as the best album of 2019, it was included in numerous publications' year-end and decade-end lists. In support of both Sweetener and Thank U, Next, Grande embarked on the Sweetener World Tour, beginning on March 18, 2019. The concert tour was commercially successful, grossing over $146 million from 97 shows. Thank U, Next and its songs received nominations for four Grammy Awards, an American Music Award, a Billboard Music Award and a Juno Award.

Background and recording 
In August 2018, singer Ariana Grande's Sweetener was released to critical acclaim, her best received album to that point. Grande began contemplating her follow-up as she prepared touring. Republic Records sought to bolster Sweetener global rollout by releasing "Breathin" as the third single, but the label abruptly postponed their promotional endeavors when Grande's old friend and ex-boyfriend, rapper Mac Miller, died from an accidental drug overdose in early September. Grande then took a brief hiatus from the media to record new material. By the following month, the still reticent singer expressed renewed interest in touring, one supporting both Sweetener and her forthcoming project, and she soon announced the initial leg of her Sweetener World Tour. At the same time, Grande ended her five-month engagement with comedian Pete Davidson.

Thank U, Next recording commenced less than two months after the release of Sweetener. The producers conducted most of their recordings at Jungle City Studios in New York City and scheduled additional sessions in New York's Right Track Studios, MXM, Conway Recording Studios and the Record Plant in metropolitan Los Angeles, Wolf Cousins Studios in Stockholm, and Entirety Studios in London.

The fallout of Miller's death influenced Grande's choice of collaborators. She assembled Thank U, Next production team from producers and songwriters with shared rapport to better cope with the trauma. Longtime collaborators Max Martin, Ilya Salmanzadeh, and Tommy Brown composed most of the tracks and shared responsibilities with Charles Anderson, Social House's Michael Foster, among others, in the formation of the music.

The development of Thank U, Next was unusually swift, but productive. Grande and her team wrote about nine songs in merely a week, and they completed most of the recording after another two weeks. Grande's team kept champagne in the studio, notably Veuve Clicquot, as later referenced in her collaboration with songwriter Victoria Monét, "Monopoly". Monét contributed to six songs, including "Ghostin", the first and simultaneously longest song to develop. Grande found creating "Ghostin" difficult and initially requested the song's exclusion from the final track listing.

Composition

Music and lyrics 

Thank U, Next is a pop, R&B and trap record with many influences of hip hop on its beats and productions. It explores a diversity of other music genres, including dancehall, soul, pop-rap and many urban influences. Rob Sheffield from Rolling Stone stated that the album is about a woman taking her mood "out for a drive until she pedal-to-the-metals it right off a cliff." In an interview with Zach Sang she said: "We walked to the studio everyday, and just made music and it turned everything around in my life. It sounds very corny but it was like, the most beautiful."

Songs 

The album begins with the song "Imagine", an R&B ballad with a trap-inspired rhythm. The song features multiple whistle notes, and its lyrics speak about Grande's denial of failed relationships, specifically her relationship with Mac Miller. The next track "Needy" is a mid-tempo minimalistic song with a metronome-like synth in the foreground. Its lyrics are about Grande's insecurities in relationships. "NASA," named after the U.S. space agency of the same name, is a "bouncy-R&B tune" with "thumping bass and trap drums". The track features a spoken introduction by Shangela, an American drag queen. She says, "One small step for woman, one giant leap for womankind", a variation on Neil Armstrong's quote, "That's one small step for a man, one giant leap for mankind." The fourth track is "Bloodline." It is a reggae-pop song with R&B influences that contains brassy horns and a pounding bass. It has been compared to Grande's 2016 single "Side to Side" and "Greedy" from her third studio album, Dangerous Woman. The song features a sound bite from Marjorie Grande, Grande's grandmother, in which she is talking about a hearing aid. The Guardian wrote that the song "posits the idea that maybe it's best to just see how things go relationship-wise and getting engaged after a few months isn't essential", believing that this song is about Pete Davidson.

The fifth track off the album is "Fake Smile", a hip hop soul-inspired track with a trap groove. Lyrically, the song is about the attack on her concert in Manchester and the death of ex-boyfriend Mac Miller, and the emotional toll that these events inflicted upon her. "Bad Idea" is an EDM and trap number, beginning with an 80's rock-ballad intro that garnered comparison to David Guetta's 2012 hit single "Titanium" featuring Sia. With an orchestra throughout the bridge and outro, its lyrics are about Grande's desire to numb her pain. The seventh track "Make Up" is Grande's most sexually explicit song on the album, featuring many double entendres. It is a trap record with wonky pop and bubblegum influences and it contains a "rap-influenced bridge". "Ghostin", the eighth track, is an emotional synth-and-strings ballad. Lyrically, it discusses Grande's last two relationships, stating that "she should ghost the guy that still makes her cry and wants to stop hurting the person she is with now while he is being patient with her," being Miller and Davidson. Savan Kotecha, who co-wrote the song with Grande, told Rolling Stone of working on the track: "[When we were writing] 'Ghostin,' we were in New York... The song speaks for itself in terms of what it's about. We were with her for a week in New York witnessing that, witnessing her feelings on that." According to Grande, she "begged" her manager, Scooter Braun, to remove the track from the album, but he convinced her to keep it.

The ninth track "In My Head" begins with an excerpt of a voicemail from by Grande's close friend Doug Middlebrook. It is a trap-pop hybrid with many R&B influences. "7 Rings," the tenth track, is a trap-pop and R&B song. It features a heavy bass and sees Grande discuss "how global success has allowed her to enjoy the finer things". Billboard magazine noted it's "the most hip-hop-leaning song Grande has released in the post-Sweetener era yet, with Grande almost rapping the song's verses". The album's lead single, "Thank U, Next" is the eleventh track on the album. A self-empowerment pop and R&B song with elements of synth-pop,  its lyrics discuss many of Grande's past relationships. Grande explained in an interview that "thank u, next..." is a phrase that she and fellow singer/songwriter Victoria Monét use. The final track "Break Up with Your Girlfriend, I'm Bored" is a trap-pop and R&B song. It was said to be Grande's most eye-catching song from the album. The track replaced "Remember", a song previously planned to be on the album, but was too personal for Grande to release. It samples "It Makes Me Ill" by NSYNC in the bridge.

Release and promotion 
Thank U, Next was released worldwide on February 8, 2019, by Republic Records, five months and 22 days after Sweetener, which was released on August 17, 2018. On releasing the album so soon after her previous offering, Grande said she dreamed of putting out music like a rapper does and break "certain standards that pop women are held to that men aren't." Tired of previous release strategies used for her records, she explained: "'Bruh, I just want to fucking talk to my fans and sing and write music and drop it the way these boys do. Why do they get to make records like that and I don't?' So I do and I did and I am, and I will continue to."

The album cover art, shot by Alfredo Flores, shows Grande laying upside-down on the floor with the album title painted on her neck. The digital edition cover features a pink border, whilst the physical edition features a black border.

Tour 
On October 25, 2018, Grande officially announced the Sweetener World Tour, in promotion of both Thank U, Next and Sweetener. The tour began on March 18, 2019, with the first leg consisting of 50 shows across North America. The second leg of the tour began on August 17, 2019, consisting of 30 shows across Europe. The third leg of the tour visited 18 cities across North America and finished in Inglewood, California at The Forum. Normani and Social House were announced as the opening acts for the first leg of the tour.

Singles 
The title track was released as the lead single from the album on November 3, 2018, without prior announcements. Commercially, the single was a massive success, peaking at number-one of the charts of 12 countries and breaking a string of records. The song also became Grande's first number-one single on the US Billboard Hot 100. She performed the song on The Ellen DeGeneres Show on November 7. Its accompanying music video was released on November 30, which broke the records for both the most-watched music video in YouTube within 24 hours and the fastest Vevo video to reach 100 million views on YouTube. The song spawned an Internet meme, inspired by the lyrics "One taught me love/one taught me patience / one taught me pain". In a similar fashion, it has also been used as a slogan.

"7 Rings" was released as the second single on January 18, 2019. The track was also commercially successful, peaking atop the charts of 15 countries, including the US, debuting atop of the Billboard Hot 100, making Grande the third female artist to have two or more songs debuting at the top slot of the Hot 100. This also made Grande the third artist in history to have an album with two songs that debuted at number one on the Hot 100, after Drake's Scorpion in 2018 and Mariah Carey's Daydream in 1995. It received generally mixed reviews from music critics, and was the center of plagiarism accusations from multiple artists. "7 Rings" was also nominated for Record of the Year and Best Pop Solo Performance at the 62nd Annual Grammy Awards.

"Break Up with Your Girlfriend, I'm Bored" was released as the third single on February 8, 2019, the same day the album came out. The song debuted atop of the charts in Ireland and the United Kingdom. In the latter, Grande became the first female artist to replace herself at number one on the chart, and joined only three other artists in having three chart-topping singles in under 100 days. As the track became her fifth number-one single in Ireland, Grande now also holds the record for the most number ones in the 2010s decade on the chart, alongside Rihanna. "Break Up with Your Girlfriend, I'm Bored" debuted at number two on the Billboard Hot 100, becoming Grande's 13th top ten single on the chart. With this single at number two, "7 Rings" at number one and "Thank U, Next" at number three, Grande became the first artist to hold the top three on the chart since the Beatles in 1964.

"Imagine" was released as the album's only promotional single on December 14, 2018. Grande performed the song on The Tonight Show Starring Jimmy Fallon on December 18.

Critical reception 

Upon release, Thank U, Next received widespread acclaim from music critics. At Metacritic, which assigns a normalized rating out of 100 to reviews from mainstream critics, the album has an average score of 86 based on 24 reviews, indicating "universal acclaim"; it is the highest Metascore for any of Grande's albums.

Rob Sheffield of Rolling Stone stated that Thank U, Next is "one of the year's best pop albums so far, even in a 2019 that's already turning out to be a great one for new music. Thank U, Next makes you suspect that the best Ariana is yet to come." Ross Horton from The Line of Best Fit praised both the songwriting and production of the album, stating that it is an "airtight, dense pop record with an obnoxiously brash production" and commenting that "even the most delicate, sensual things here are tightly compressed and scrubbed of anything resembling acoustics." AllMusic's Stephen Thomas Erlewine also gave the album a positive review, commenting that "Grande is swaggering with [...] confidence" and concluding that the album "embodies every aspect of Ariana Grande, the grand pop star." Mikael Wood of the Los Angeles Times said, "Thank U, Next flaunts Grande's emotional healing; it's suffused with the joy of discovering that what didn't kill her really did make her stronger."

Michael Cragg of The Guardian commented that Thank U, Next seems to be a "result of a burst of creativity and a prevailing mood", yet criticized "7 Rings" as a "braggadocious, ice-cold low point" of the album. He concluded positively, stating that Grande is a "pop star [...] finally working out who they are and what they want to say" and compared the album to Rihanna's Anti. Helen Brown from The Independent stated that Grande is "embracing her inner mean girl (on the sexy "Break Up with Your Girlfriend, I'm Bored") [and] owning her flaws and contradictions" on tracks such as "Needy" and "NASA", yet concluded that the album lacks enough "vocal grit". Sal Cinquemani from Slant Magazine awarded the album three-and-a-half stars out of five, believing that the album "is easily Grande's most sonically consistent effort to date". He criticized that "some of the [...] tracks tend to blur together", but ultimately concluded in saying that Grande's "refusal to fake a smile that proves to be what makes her so damn likeable." In a capsule review for Vice, Robert Christgau gave the album a three-star honorable mention and summed it up as Grande's "maturing from multitracked studio trickeration to straight love songs—love songs an old grouch might complain are all too superstar-specific"; the title track and "Ghostin'" were cited as highlights.

MTV named it as one of the ten albums of 2019, stating that the album "unpacks love, lust, and pain in a metallic pop coating. It's cooler, weirder, and deeper than Sweetener, and manages to make that project look shockingly surface-level". Billboard ranked Thank U, Next as their number best album of 2019, stating that "the pop princess officially became a queen".
This was also the second consecutive year that Billboard ranked Grande's album as the best of year after naming the artist's previous album, Sweetener, as their number one best album of 2018. Billboard complimented Grande's liberation to guilt, emotional restraint and independence, they said "in the aftermath of her personal struggles from that year, she found solace in the studio, sipping champagne with her friends and collaborators, while writing and recording the best album of her career in just two weeks". Thank U, Next placed on Billboard's decade end album's list "The 100 Greatest Albums of the 2010s", at number eight.

Year-end accolades

Decade-end accolades

Awards and nominations

Commercial performance

United States 
Thank U, Next debuted at number-one on the US Billboard 200 chart, earning 360,000 album-equivalent units in its opening week, of which 116,000 came from pure sales. It was Grande's fourth number one album, and second in less than six months; marking the shortest gap between number one albums for a woman at the time since Olivia Newton-John's If You Love Me, Let Me Know (1974) and Have You Ever Been Mellow (1975). Its opening week figure of 360,000 was also the largest for a pop album since Taylor Swift's Reputation (2017). Thank U, Next's tracks collected a total of 307 million on-demand audio streams in its first week, representing the largest US streaming week ever for a female artist and pop album. Overall, it earned the eighth-largest streaming debut ever in the US. Billboard also noted that of the 20 largest album streaming weeks at the time, Thank U, Next was the only non-hip hop title present.

On the Billboard Hot 100 chart, issue dated February 20, all 12 songs from Thank U, Next appeared simultaneously; eleven of those songs appeared in the top 40, breaking the record for the most simultaneous top 40 entries by a female artist. The following week, issue dated February 27, all 12 of the album's tracks remained on the chart for a second consecutive week. In its second week, the album remained atop the chart, earning an additional 151,000 units, consisting of 20,000 pure album sales, becoming Grande's first album to spend multiple weeks at number one. It earned 168.6 million on-demand streams in its second week, marking (at the time) the third-largest streaming week ever by a woman, and the second-largest for a pop album, behind its own first week figure.

Thank U, Next was 2019's second-best-performing album on the Billboard 200 chart. It spent 168 weeks on the chart, becoming Grande's longest-running album. Combining singles sales and streaming, Thank U, Next sold 2.056 million units throughout 2019, and was certified double platinum by the Recording Industry Association of America (RIAA) for exceeding two million units in the US in June 2020. As of June 2020, the album has sold 302,000 units in the country.

Elsewhere 
In the United Kingdom, Thank U, Next debuted at number one on the UK Albums Chart with 65,000 album-equivalent units. The album became Grande's third number-one on the chart and marked her largest album opening week to date there. Earning 59 million streams, Thank U, Next set a new record for most album streams ever by a female artist in a week in the country, beating her previous album, Sweetener. Following its release, "Break Up with Your Girlfriend, I'm Bored" debuted at number one on the UK Singles Chart, replacing "7 Rings", with the latter returning to number one the following week, making Grande the first female solo artist since Madonna in 1985 to simultaneously hold the number one and two spots on the UK Singles Chart and the first musical artist to replace herself twice consecutively at number one in UK chart history. Also, "Needy" peaked at number eight on the chart. Thank U, Next also was 2019's third fastest-selling download by a female artist in the UK, behind Taylor Swift's Lover and Pink's Hurts 2B Human.

In Ireland, Thank U, Next also became Grande's third number one on the Irish Albums Chart, selling nearly 5,389 units, more than the rest of the top five combined (according to Official Charts Company). Upon its release, Thank U, Next became the only female album this decade to feature three Irish number-one singles. Following the success of the album, Sweetener (2018) arose three places to number eight, and Dangerous Woman (2016) re-entered the top 50 at number 43. In Australia, Thank U, Next debuted at number one on the Australian Albums Chart, becoming Grande's fourth number one in the territory. All 12 album tracks also appeared on the ARIA Singles Chart.

Thank U, Next has sold more than one million pure copies worldwide. It was the eighth best-selling album of 2019 globally and ranked fourth among female artists.

Track listing

Notes 
  signifies a co-producer
"Fake Smile" contains a sample of "After Laughter (Comes Tears)" performed by Wendy Rene, written by Joseph W. Frierson and Mary Lou Frierson.
"7 Rings" interpolates portions of "My Favorite Things", written by Oscar Hammerstein II and Richard Rodgers.
"Break Up with Your Girlfriend, I'm Bored" contains an interpolation of "It Makes Me Ill" by NSYNC.

Personnel 
Credits adapted from Tidal and the album's liner notes.

Vocals 

 Ariana Grande – primary artist
 Victoria Monét – background vocals 
 Tayla Parx – background vocals 
 Marjorie Grande – background vocals 
 Doug Middlebrook – background vocals 
 Shangela Laquifa Wadley – uncredited vocals

Instrumentation 

 Happy Perez – guitar , keyboards 
 Pop Wansel – keyboards 
 Peter Lee Johnson – strings 
 Wojtek Bylund – alto saxophone 
 Ilya Salmanzadeh – bass , drums , guitar , keyboards , string arrangement 
 Janne Bjerger – trumpet 
 Max Martin – bass , drums , guitar , keyboards , string arrangement 
 Mattias Bylund – horns arrangement , strings , string arrangement , violin 
 Magnus Johannson – trumpet 
 Peter Noos Johannson – trombone 
 Tomas Jonnson (Jonsson)– tenor saxophone 
 JProof – keyboards 
 David Bukovinszky – cello 
 Alexander West – guitar 
 Larrance Dopson – guitar 
 Mattias Johansson – violin

Production 

 Ariana Grande – executive production, vocal production , musical arranger (track 11)
 Scooter Braun – executive production
 Happy Perez – production 
 Pop Wansel – production 
 Tommy Brown – production 
 Charles Anderson – production 
 Max Martin – production , vocal production 
 Ilya Salmanzadeh – production , vocal production 
 Brian Baptiste – production 
 Michael Foster – production 
 Victoria Monét – vocal production 
 Tayla Parx – vocal production 
 Nova Wav – co-production 
 Andrew Luftman – production coordination 
 Sarah Shelton – production coordination 
 Zvi Edelman – production coordination

Technical 

 Happy Perez – programming 
 Pop Wansel – programming 
 Tommy Brown – programming 
 Charles Anderson – programming 
 Ilya Salmanzadeh – programming 
 Max Martin – programming 
 Michael Foster – programming 
 John Hanes – mixing , mixing assistance 
 Serban Ghenea – mixing 
 Billy Hickey – engineering 
 Sam Holland – engineering 
 Brendan Morawski – recording , engineering 
 Joe Gallagher – recording , engineering 
 Sean Klein – recording assistance , remix engineering assistance 
 Jeremy Lertola – recording assistance 
 Cory Bice – recording assistance

Artwork 

 Jessica Severn – art direction and design
 Brian "kid orange" Nicholson – Neck tag/graffiti artwork
 Alfredo Flores – photography

Charts

Weekly charts

Monthly charts

Year-end charts

Decade-end charts

Certifications and sales

Release history

See also 

 List of Billboard 200 number-one albums of 2019
 List of number-one albums of 2019 (Australia)
 List of number-one hits of 2019 (Austria)
 List of number-one albums of 2019 (Belgium)
 List of number-one albums of 2019 (Canada)
 List of number-one albums from the 2010s (Denmark)
 List of number-one albums of 2019 (Ireland)
 List of number-one albums of 2019 (Mexico)
 List of number-one albums from the 2010s (New Zealand)
 List of number-one albums in Norway
 List of number-one albums of 2019 (Scotland)
 List of number-one albums of 2019 (Sweden)
 List of UK Albums Chart number ones of the 2010s
 List of UK Album Downloads Chart number ones of the 2010s

References 

2019 albums
Albums produced by Happy Perez
Albums produced by Ilya Salmanzadeh
Albums produced by Max Martin
Albums produced by Tommy Brown (record producer)
Albums recorded at Record Plant (Los Angeles)
Ariana Grande albums
Contemporary R&B albums by American artists
Pop albums by American artists
Republic Records albums
Trap music albums